Loranthaceae, commonly known as the showy mistletoes, is a family of flowering plants. It consists of about 75 genera and 1,000 species of woody plants, many of them hemiparasites. The three terrestrial species are Nuytsia floribunda (the Western Australian Christmas tree), Atkinsonia ligustrina  (from the Blue Mountains of Australia), and Gaiadendron punctatum (from Central/South America.) Loranthaceae are primarily xylem parasites, but their haustoria may sometimes tap the phloem, while Tristerix aphyllus is almost holoparasitic.
For a more complete description of the Australian Loranthaceae, see Flora of Australia online., for the Malesian Loranthaceae see Flora of Malesia.

Originally, Loranthaceae contained all mistletoe species, but the mistletoes of Europe and North America (Viscum, Arceuthobium, and Phoradendron) belong to the family Santalaceae. The APG II system 2003 assigns the family to the order Santalales in the clade core eudicots.

Phylogeny
Molecular phylogenetics suggests the following relationships of tribes, subtribes and genera:  Nuytsia is sister to the rest the Loranthaceae, with many characters, including its pollen, its fruit (dry and three winged), and the number of its cotyledons, differing substantially from all other Loranthaceae genera. The root parasitic habit is thought to be the basal condition of the family., with the stem/branch parasitic habit evolving ca. 28-40  million years ago.  However, Grimsson et al. (2017) estimate this as occurring somewhat earlier (ca. 40-52 million years ago).

Genera 

Kingella is listed as a synonym of Trithecanthera Tiegh by Plants of the World Online. Also Ixocactus is listed as a synonym of Phthirusa Mart. and Tetradyas is listed as a synonym of Cyne Danser.

See also
Parasitic plant

References

External links

Loranthaceae on the Parasitic Plant Connection web site
Notanthera heterophylla illustrations
Chilean Loranthaceae at Chileflora

 
Eudicot families